Happy Just to Be Like I Am is the fourth studio album by American blues artist Taj Mahal.

Track listing
All tracks composed by Taj Mahal; except where indicated
 "Happy Just to Be Like I Am" (3:49)
 "Stealin'" (Gus Cannon) (6:58)
 "Oh, Susannah" (Traditional) (5:19)
 "Eighteen Hammers" (5:45)
 "Tomorrow May Not Be Your Day" (4:14)
 "Chevrolet" (Ed Young, Lonnie Young) (2:45)
 "West Indian Revelation (AKA West Indian Reservation)" (6:09)
 "Black Spirit Boogie" (7:10)

Personnel
Taj Mahal - guitar, steel guitar, mandolin
Bill Rich - bass
Howard Johnson - baritone saxophone
Jesse Ed Davis - guitar on "Oh Susanna" and "Chevrolet"
Earl McIntyre - trombone
Andy Narell - steel drums on "West Indian Revelation"
John Simon - piano
Hoshal Wright - guitar
Kwasi "Rocky" Dzidzornu - conga
Bob Stewart - flugelhorn
Joseph Daley - tuba
James Charles Otey, Jr. - drums
Technical
Glen Kolotkin - engineer
John Simon, Taj Mahal - mixing

References

1971 albums
Taj Mahal (musician) albums
Columbia Records albums
Albums produced by Dave Rubinson
Albums produced by Taj Mahal (musician)